Binakol, also spelled binakoe, is a Filipino chicken soup made from chicken cooked in coconut water with grated coconut, green papaya (or chayote), leafy vegetables, garlic, onion, ginger, lemongrass, and patis (fish sauce). It can also be spiced with chilis. Binakol can also be cooked with other kinds of meat or seafood. It was traditionally cooked inside bamboo tubes or directly on halved coconut shells. The dish originates from the Western Visayas, particularly the province of Aklan.

The dish is very similar to tinola and ginataang manok, except the latter two use water and coconut milk, respectively, instead of coconut water.

See also
Inubaran
Pininyahang manok
Tiyula itum

References

Philippine soups
Philippine chicken dishes
Foods containing coconut